Kinlichee, also known historically as Kin Li Chee, Kin-Li-Chee, or Kin-li-Chee, is a populated place situated in Apache County, Arizona, United States, six miles north-northeast of Ganado. The current name was officially recognized as a result of a decision by the Board on Geographic Names in 1983. The name is derived from the Navajo kin dah lichi'i, which means "red house up at an elevation".

The location has a boarding school, Kin Dah Lichi'i Olta', which opened in its most recent incarnation in 1999. The town is also home to a unique bed and breakfast, Tse Li Gah Sinil. An octagonal log structure, the lodging establishment allows visitors to spend the night in a traditional Navajo hogan.

Kinlichee was home to Nelson J. "Jerome" McCabe, former Chief Justice of the Supreme Court of the Navajo Nation. McCabe died in 2014, and is buried in the Kinlichee Community Cemetery. Craig Curley, a Native American distance runner, was also born in Kinlichee.

References

Populated places in Apache County, Arizona
Arizona placenames of Native American origin